Winne-Podbukowina  is a village in the administrative district of Gmina Dubiecko, within Przemyśl County, Podkarpackie Voivodeship, in south-eastern Poland.

The village has a population of 274.

References

Winne-Podbukowina